Toms Run is a stream located entirely within Montgomery County, Ohio.

Toms Run was named in honor of Tom Kilbuck, a Native American chieftain.

See also
List of rivers of Ohio

References

Rivers of Montgomery County, Ohio
Rivers of Ohio